Good Blonde & Others is a collection of works by Jack Kerouac.  This collection includes short stories, essays, articles, literary criticism, and his essentials for spontaneous prose. It is largely seen as a look into the non-fiction life of Beat Generation author Jack Kerouac.

Table of contents
On the Road
On the Beats
On Writing
Observations
On Sports
Last Words
cityCityCITY
Editor's Note

References

1993 books
Books by Jack Kerouac